John Sheppard (24 February 1922 – 29 March 2015) was a car designer who worked with Alec Issigonis on the Austin Mini and later on British Leyland's Metro, Maestro and Montego. He also designed the body for the Mini Moke.

References

External links 
https://web.archive.org/web/20141021124608/http://www.miniworld.co.uk/features/miniworld-features/436-issigonis-and-the-9x-projects
http://oxfordbusinesspark.com/news/legendary-car-designer-honoured-oxford-business-park

1922 births
2015 deaths
British automobile designers
People from Birmingham, West Midlands